Ulisse Pichi (1867–1925) was an Italian painter born in Livorno. He often painted military subjects and battles, but also land- and sea-scapes.

Biography
He was a pupil of Natale Betti and Giovanni Fattori. He initially exhibited in Livorno under the pseudonym of Norion S. He later became friends with Silvestro Lega. Among his works are “Lo scultore Ermenegildo Bois” and “Il ritratto della moglie al piano”.

References

1867 births
1925 deaths
19th-century Italian painters
Italian male painters
20th-century Italian painters
Italian battle painters
Painters from Florence
19th-century war artists
19th-century Italian male artists
20th-century Italian male artists